The Kansas City Power is a United States Australian Football League team, based in Kansas City, United States. It was founded in 1997 and won Division 3 USAFL Grand Finals in 2003 and 2008.  They play in the USAFL.

See also

References

External links

Australian rules football clubs in the United States
Sports in the Kansas City metropolitan area
Australian rules football clubs established in 1998
1998 establishments in Missouri